The Hamiltonian constraint arises from any theory that admits a Hamiltonian formulation and is reparametrisation-invariant. The Hamiltonian constraint of general relativity is an important non-trivial example.

In the context of general relativity, the Hamiltonian constraint technically refers to a linear combination of spatial and time diffeomorphism constraints reflecting the reparametrizability of the theory under both spatial as well as time coordinates. However, most of the time the term Hamiltonian constraint is reserved for the constraint that generates time diffeomorphisms.

Simplest example: the parametrized clock and pendulum system

Parametrization 

In its usual presentation, classical mechanics appears to give time a special role as an independent variable. This is unnecessary, however.  Mechanics can be formulated to treat the time variable on the same footing as the other variables in an extended phase space, by parameterizing the temporal variable(s) in terms of a common, albeit unspecified parameter variable. Phase space variables being on the same footing.

Say our system comprised a pendulum executing a simple harmonic motion and a clock. Whereas the system could be described classically by a position x=x(t), with x defined as a function of time, it is also possible to describe the same system as x() and t() where the relation between x and t is not directly specified.  Instead, x and t are determined by the parameter , which is simply a parameter of the system, possibly having no objective meaning in its own right.

The system would be described by the position of a pendulum from the center, denoted , and the reading on the clock, denoted . We put these variables on the same footing by introducing a fictitious parameter ,

whose 'evolution' with respect to  takes us continuously through every possible correlation between the displacement and reading on the clock. Obviously the variable  can be replaced by any monotonic function, . This is what makes the system reparametrisation-invariant. Dynamics is then determined by this relationship.

Dynamics of this reparametrization-invariant system 

The action for the parametrized Harmonic oscillator is then

Writing the action as

which gives a constraint,

 is our Hamiltonian constraint! It could also be obtained from the Euler–Lagrange equation of motion, noting that the action depends on  but not its  derivative. The 'smeared' Hamiltonian constraint tells us how an extended phase space variable (or function thereof) evolves with respect to :

(these are actually the other Hamilton's equations). These equations describe a flow or orbit in phase space. In general we have

for any phase space function . As the Hamiltonian constraint Poisson commutes with itself, it preserves itself and hence the constraint-hypersurface.

Deparametrization 

The other equations of Hamiltonian mechanics are

Upon substitution of our action these give,

These represent the fundamental equations governing our system.

Now  and  can be deduced by

We recover the usual differential equation for the simple harmonic oscillator,

We also have  or 

Our Hamiltonian constraint is then easily seen as the condition of constancy of energy! Deparametrization and the identification of a time variable with respect to which everything evolves is the opposite process of parametrization. It turns out in general that not all reparametrisation-invariant systems can be deparametrized. General relativity being a prime physical example (here the spacetime coordinates correspond to the unphysical  and the Hamiltonian is a linear combination of constraints which generate spatial and time diffeomorphisms).

Reason why we could deparametrize here 

The underlining reason why we could deparametrize (aside from the fact that we already know it was an artificial reparametrization in the first place) is the mathematical form of the constraint, namely,

Substitute the Hamiltonian constraint into the original action we obtain

which is the standard action for the harmonic oscillator. General relativity is an example of a physical theory where the Hamiltonian constraint isn't of the above mathematical form in general, and so cannot be deparametrized in general.

Hamiltonian of classical general relativity 

In the ADM formulation of general relativity one splits spacetime into spatial slices and time, the basic variables are taken to be the induced metric, on the spatial slice (the metric induced on the spatial slice by the spacetime metric), and its conjugate momentum variable related to the extrinsic curvature, (this tells us how the spatial slice curves with respect to spacetime and is a measure of how the induced metric evolves in time). These are the metric canonical coordinates.

Dynamics such as time-evolutions of fields are controlled by the Hamiltonian constraint.

The identity of the Hamiltonian constraint is a major open question in quantum gravity, as is extracting of physical observables from any such specific constraint.

In 1986 Abhay Ashtekar introduced a new set of canonical variables, Ashtekar variables to represent an unusual way of rewriting the metric canonical variables on the three-dimensional spatial slices in terms of a SU(2) gauge field and its complementary variable. The Hamiltonian was much simplified in this reformulation. This led to the loop representation of quantum general relativity and in turn loop quantum gravity.

Within the loop quantum gravity representation  Thiemann formulated a mathematically rigorous operator as a proposal as such a constraint. Although this operator defines a complete and consistent quantum theory, doubts have been raised as to the physical reality of this theory due to inconsistencies with classical general relativity (the quantum constraint algebra closes, but it is not isomorphic to the classical constraint algebra of GR, which is seen as circumstantial evidence of inconsistencies definitely not a proof of inconsistencies), and so variants have been proposed.

Metric formulation 

However, this program soon became regarded as dauntingly difficult for various reasons, one being the non-polynomial nature of the Hamiltonian constraint:

where  is the scalar curvature of the three metric . Being a non-polynomial expression in the canonical variables and their derivatives it is very difficult to promote to a quantum operator.

Expression using Ashtekar variables 

The configuration variables of Ashtekar's variables behave like an  gauge field or connection . What do these variables have to do with gravity? The densitized triads can be used to reconstruct the spatial metric via

The densitized triads are not unique, and in fact one can perform a local in space rotation with respect to the internal indices . This is actually the origin of the  gauge invariance. The connection can be used to reconstruct the extrinsic curvature. The relation is given by

In terms of Ashtekar variables the classical expression of the constraint is given by,

where  field strength tensor of the gauge field  . Due to the factor  this is non-polynomial in the Ashtekar's variables. Since we impose the condition

we could consider the densitized Hamiltonian instead,

This Hamiltonian is now polynomial the Ashtekar's variables. This development raised new hopes for the canonical quantum gravity programme. Although Ashtekar variables had the virtue of simplifying the Hamiltonian, it has the problem that the variables become complex. When one quantizes the theory it is a difficult task ensure that one recovers real general relativity as opposed to complex general relativity. Also there were also serious difficulties promoting the densitized Hamiltonian to a quantum operator.

A way of addressing the problem of reality conditions was noting that if we took the signature to be , that is Euclidean instead of Lorentzian, then one can retain the simple form of the Hamiltonian for but for real variables. One can then define what is called a generalized Wick rotation to recover the Lorentzian theory. Generalized as it is a Wick transformation in phase space and has nothing to do with analytical continuation of the time parameter .

Expression for real formulation of Ashtekar variables 

Thomas Thiemann  addressed both the above problems. He used the real connection

In real Ashtekar variables the full Hamiltonian is

where the constant  is the Barbero–Immirzi parameter. The constant  is -1 for Lorentzian signature and +1 for Euclidean signature. The  have a complicated relationship with the densitized triads and causes serious problems upon quantization. Ashtekar variables can be seen as choosing  to make the second more complicated term was made to vanish (the first term is denoted  because for the Euclidean theory this term remains for the real choice of ). Also we still have the problem of the   factor.

Thiemann was able to make it work for real . First he could simplify the troublesome  by using the identity

where  is the volume,

The first term of the Hamiltonian constraint becomes

upon using Thiemann's identity. This Poisson bracket is replaced by a commutator upon quantization. It turns out that a similar trick can be used to teat the second term. Why are the  given by the densitized triads ? It actually come about from the Gauss Law

We can solve this in much the same way as the Levi-Civita connection can be calculated from the equation ; by rotating the various indices and then adding and subtracting them. The result is complicated and non-linear. To circumvent the problems introduced by this complicated relationship Thiemann first defines the Gauss gauge invariant quantity

where , and notes that

We are then able to write

We obtain for the second term of the Hamiltonian

Why is it easier to quantize ? This is because it can be rewritten in terms of quantities that we already know how to quantize. Specifically  can be rewritten as

where we have used that the integrated densitized trace of the extrinsic curvature is the "time derivative of the volume".

References

External links
Overview by Carlo Rovelli
Thiemann's paper in Physics Letters
Good information on LQG

Loop quantum gravity